The Sin Hung-class patrol boat is a class of patrol boats in service with the Korean People's Navy.

Construction
Construction of the Sin Hung class was first noticed in early 1984, when six Sin Hung hulls were seen being built without torpedo tubes or sponsons. A total of eight were seen to be built, all at the Nampo Shipyard. Two of these were sold to Nicaragua in late May of the same year.

References

Patrol boats of North Korea
Patrol boat classes